Wołosate  (Volosate) is a village in the administrative district of Gmina Lutowiska, within Bieszczady County, Subcarpathian Voivodeship, in south-eastern Poland, close to the border with Ukraine. It is also the southernmost inhabited village in Poland.

The village has a population of 44.

Demographics
The village's main language is Polish but there is a small group of Ukrainians speaking their native language. 97.3% of Wołosate is Polish while 2.4% is Ukrainian.

References

Villages in Bieszczady County